Volcanic Hills may refer to:
 Volcanic Hills (California) in San Diego County, California, USA
 Volcanic Hills (Nevada) in Esmeralda County, Nevada, USA

See also 
 Volcan Mountains in San Diego County, California, USA
 Volcanic cone, among the simplest volcanic landforms
 Volcano, a rupture in the crust of a planetary-mass object